Chemerivtsi is an urban-type settlement in Kamianets-Podilskyi Raion, Khmelnytskyi Oblast (province) in western Ukraine. It hosts the administration of Chemerivtsi settlement hromada, one of the hromadas of Ukraine. The settlement's population was 5,431 as of the 2001 Ukrainian Census and 

Chemerivtsi was first founded in 1565 and it received the Magdeburg rights in 1797. It received the status of an urban-type settlement in 1959.

Until 18 July 2020, Chemerivtsi was the administrative center of Chemerivtsi Raion. The raion was abolished in July 2020 as part of the administrative reform of Ukraine, which reduced the number of raions of Khmelnytskyi Oblast to three. The area of Chemerivtsi Raion was merged into Kamianets-Podilskyi Raion.

See also
 Zakupne, the other urban-type settlement in the Chemerivtsi Raion of Khmelnytskyi Oblast

References

External links
 

Urban-type settlements in Kamianets-Podilskyi Raion
Populated places established in 1565
16th-century establishments in Ukraine
Kamenets-Podolsky Uyezd